The men's team regu sepak takraw competition at the 1998 Asian Games in Bangkok was held from 7 to 12 December at the Indoor Stadium Huamark.

Results

Preliminaries

Group A

Group B

Knockout round

References 

Results

Sepak takraw at the 1998 Asian Games